Engel Stadium is a stadium in Chattanooga, Tennessee. The stadium was built in 1930 and holds 12,000 people. It was the home of the Chattanooga Lookouts until 1999 when they moved to their current stadium, AT&T Field. The former Tennessee Temple University held its home games at Engel after the Lookouts left. Engel Stadium was named for longtime President of the Chattanooga Lookouts, Joe Engel.

The ballpark is located at 1130 E. 3rd Street, at the corner of O'Neal Street, adjacent to the historic Fort Wood neighborhood, Norfolk Southern's DeButts Yard, and Erlanger Hospital.

History
In 1929, Clark Griffith, owner of the Washington Senators sent a young scout by the name of Joe Engel to the South to find a home for the club's first minor league affiliate. First, Engel went to Atlanta with cash in hand to buy the Atlanta Crackers, but for reasons unknown he backed out and came north to Chattanooga, Tennessee. Engel not only bought the Chattanooga Lookouts from Sammy Strang, but also replaced their ballpark, Andrews Field with a state-of-the-art stadium at a cost of $150,000.

Andrews Field had been the team's home since 1911. (Their first two seasons, 1909 and 1910, they played their games at Chamberlain Field.) Andrews was on the same block as Engel Stadium, with home plate in the opposite corner. The rebuilding effort was sufficiently completed to allow the new facility to open for exhibition play on March 23, 1930. The regular season opener was April 15, 1930.

Engel Stadium featured a spacious outfield, especially the corner to the left of straightaway center field, which was posted as 471 feet. The gradual rise of Third Street along the left field wall necessitated a "terrace" or hill to make up the difference in grade between the field and the street. The terrace contained the word "LOOKOUTS" in large letters. Harmon Killebrew is said to be the only man to hit a ball over the deepest part of the outfield.

Many of Joe Engel's famous antics also took place at Engel Stadium, gaining him the nickname, "The Barnum of Baseball." In 1931, the New York Yankees played an exhibition game at Engel Stadium against the Lookouts. During the game, a 17-year-old girl named Jackie Mitchell pitched for the Lookouts, striking out Major League greats Lou Gehrig and Babe Ruth. In 1936, a record crowd of 24,624 fans crammed into the park that only held 12,000 seats for the chance of winning a house in the middle of the Great Depression. The winning ticket was not at the game. On Opening Day in 1938, Joe Engel debuted his popular "Wild Elephant Hunt" prior to the game. It was such a success, he took it to ballparks throughout the South.

Many notables have played on the field, including Babe Ruth, Lou Gehrig, Hank Aaron, Satchel Paige, Willie Mays, Harmon Killebrew, Ferguson Jenkins, Kiki Cuyler,  and Rogers Hornsby.

When the Lookouts could not find an affiliate from 1966 to 1975, the Stadium began to deteriorate. Despite amateur games being played at Engel day and night all summer long, it was not being properly maintained. In 1972, Chattanooga News Free Press columnist Allan Morris wrote that "paint is peeling off the walls, the floor is filthy, the roof is falling down, and it looks like a tornado hit the place." When Woody Reid bought the club in 1976 and gained a Major League affiliate in the Oakland Athletics, he hosted "Sparkle Days" at the stadium, where fans volunteered their time to fixing up Engel.

In the winter of 1988, Engel Stadium underwent its first major renovation. The $2 million project called for a new look to the exterior of the stadium, a two-story front office building built down the first base line, a new press box on top of the roof, a restaurant in the concourse with a view of the field, and a resurfaced field. "We were trying to do things in a real haphazard way", said Lookouts General Manager Bill Lee. The renovation resulted in a half-million dollar lawsuit by the Lookouts against the city and county for installing a field that did not drain properly.

In the winter of 1994, Frank Burke bought the Lookouts. Years later he would say, "Finding Engel Stadium was a bit like falling in love: initially, you don't see some of the downsides." The downside was that Engel Stadium was becoming so costly to keep up that he could not turn a profit. By 1998, the situation got so severe that Burke agreed to fund a new ballpark on top of Hawk Hill, so long as he could sell 1,800 season tickets and 10 luxury boxes for his new park by February 4, 1999. Burke met his goal a week early and the Lookouts played their last game at Engel Stadium on September 10, 1999.

In 2000, Hamilton County and the city of Chattanooga assumed joint ownership of Engel Stadium.  It was subsequently leased to Tennessee Temple University for use as their baseball team's home field.  The field was modified, with a fence running across the left and center fields to reduce the dimensions of the playing field. The terrace still exists, beyond the inner fence, and covered with grass, the "LOOKOUTS" having been removed.

In 2008, UT Chattanooga acquired the property. The University will build a state-of-the-art track and field complex in the current parking lot and partner with the Engel Foundation in the restoration of the Stadium. On April 5, 2011 the City of Chattanooga passed an interim agreement allowing UTC to take control of the Stadium, pending final approval of the state government.  Vice Chancellor Richard Brown announced plans to work with The Engel Foundation to restore the Stadium, which was damaged during a tornado in April 2011.

In 2012, Engel Stadium was used as the movie set for the motion picture 42, the life story of Jackie Robinson. Much of the entire film's baseball action was shot at Engel Stadium, which also doubled for Brooklyn's Ebbetts Field. On July 18, 2012 crews began demolition to restore the ballpark back to its historical accuracy after construction was done for the movie that altered the ballpark, including moving the location of the ball fields.

The Engel Foundation
In April 2009, The Engel Foundation was formed to restore, preserve, promote, and revitalize Engel Stadium. "It is just kind of sitting there", said Foundation director Janna Jahn. "It is not getting the maintenance it needs. It is not being promoted." In its short existence, the Foundation has hosted a Great Spaces Open House at the Stadium that was attended by over a hundred people, two Legends Baseball Camps led by former major leaguers Steve Trout, Rick Honeycutt, Willie Wilson, and Jay Johnstone, and on December 14, 2009, Engel Stadium was approved as a site on the National Register of Historic Places.

The Engel Foundation plans to raise $150,000 in needed repairs. Once that is accomplished, the Foundation wants to promote Engel as a destination for events from Little League Baseball, to middle/ high school baseball to adult league baseball. The venue could also serve as a museum to Chattanooga baseball, a site for concerts, and other community events.

In May 2013 the Foundation announced that the stadium would be renovated and ready to hold baseball games by the 2014 season. The foundation released a statement claiming that $200,000 will be necessary to complete the renovations.

References

External links

 The Engel Foundation Official website
 Photos of the ballpark in minor league days
 Recent photos
 Vintage photos of Engel Stadium

Sports venues in Chattanooga, Tennessee
Minor league baseball venues
Baseball venues in Tennessee
Tennessee Temple University
Chattanooga Mocs baseball
Negro league baseball venues still standing
Sports venues on the National Register of Historic Places in Tennessee
1930 establishments in Tennessee
Sports venues completed in 1930
Defunct college baseball venues in the United States
High school baseball venues in the United States